{{Album ratings
| rev1 = AllMusic
| rev1Score = 
| rev2 = Cash Box
| rev2Score = (favorable)
| rev3 = Muzik
| rev3Score = <ref>{{Cite magazine |last=Springer |first=Jacqueline |date=July 1996 |title=Chantay Savage: I Will Survive (Doin' My Way) |url=http://www.muzikmagazine.co.uk/issues/muzik014_july_1996.pdf |magazine=Muzik |page=126 |archive-url=https://web.archive.org/web/20220402181212/http://www.muzikmagazine.co.uk/issues/muzik014_july_1996.pdf |archive-date=2 April 2022 |access-date=16 July 2022}}</ref>
}}I Will Survive (Doin' It My Way) is the second studio album by American R&B singer Chantay Savage. It was released by RCA Records on March 30, 1996 in the United States. Savage worked with several producers on the album, including Tim & Bob, Kay Fingers, Steve "Silk" Hurley, Grand Puba, Chucky Thompson, and others. I Will Survive (Doin' It My Way) peaked at number 14 on the US Billboard Top R&B/Hip-Hop Albums. The album's lead single, a downtempo cover of Gloria Gaynor's "I Will Survive", peaked at number 5 on the US Hot R&B/Hip-Hop Songs chart.

 Track listing 

Sample credits
"All Night All Day" contains a sample of "If It Don't Turn You On" as performed by B. T. Express. 
"Love Need Want" embodies portions of the composition "Love Lines Angels and Rhymes" aswritten by Dorothea Joyce.

Personnel

 Scott Ahaus – Mixing
 Bob Antione – Arranger, Engineer, Keyboards, Producer, Programming
 Daniela Barcelo – Design
 Craig Bauer – Mixing
 Below Zero – Vocal Arrangement, Vocals (Background)
 Common Sense – Rap
 Lane Craven – Engineer
 Jerald Daemyon – Violin
 Tony Dawsey – Mastering
 Joey Donetello – Engineer
 Andre Evans – Arranger, Keyboards, Producer, Programming
 Kevin Evans – Executive Producer, Producer
 K. Fingers – Engineer, Mixing, Producer, Programming
 Rick Fritz – Mixing
 Derrick Garrett – Engineer
 Michael Gilbert – Engineer
 Grand Puba – Producer
 Loren Hill – Drum Programming
 Steve "Silk" Hurley – Arranger, Executive Producer, Guitar, Keyboards, Mixing, Producer, Programming, Vocal Arrangement
 Tim Kelley – Producer, Arranger, Design, Drums, Keyboards
 Chris Liggio – Keyboards, Producer
 Carlton Lynn – Assistant Engineer

 Glen Marchese – Assistant Engineer, Mixing Assistant
 Tony Maserati – Engineer, Mixing
 Mass Order – Mixing, Producer
 Mike Mikoola – Guitar
 David Mitchell – Engineer
 Jacqueline Murphy – Art Direction
 Wes Naprstek – Engineer
 Harve Pierre – Producer
 Brian Remenick – Assistant Engineer
 Bob Robinson – Arranger, Keyboards
 Chantay Savage – Executive Producer, Producer, Vocal Arrangement, Vocals (Background)
 Ken Schubert – Engineer
 Kenyon Scott – Assistant Engineer
 Antonio Smallios – Mixing
 Scott Steiner – Assistant Engineer, Mixing Assistant
 Chucky Thompson – Producer
 Valentine – Drum Programming, Keyboards
 Marc Van Bork – Engineer
 Russell Ward – Photography
 Steve Weeder – Engineer, Mixing
 Jimmy Wright – Fender Rhodes, Organ, Piano

Charts

References

External links
 Chantay Savage 'I Will Survive (Doin' It My Way)' — by Rudi Meyer, Vibe''

1996 albums
Albums produced by Tim & Bob
RCA Records albums
Chantay Savage albums